Gonzalo Lama was the defending champion but lost in the first round to João Souza.

Gastão Elias won the title after defeating Renzo Olivo 3–6, 6–3, 6–4 in the final.

Seeds

Draw

Finals

Top half

Bottom half

References
Main Draw
Qualifying Draw

São Paulo Challenger de Tênis - Singles
2017 Singles